The Duke Blue Devils football team represented Duke University in the 2012 NCAA Division I FBS football season as a member of the Atlantic Coast Conference (ACC) in the Coastal Division. The Blue Devils were led by fifth-year head coach David Cutcliffe and played their home games at Wallace Wade Stadium They finished the season 6–7 overall and 3–5 in ACC play to place fifth in the Coastal Division. They were invited to the Belk Bowl, the program's first bowl game since 1995, where they were defeated by Cincinnati.

Schedule

Personnel

Coaching staff

Roster

Game summaries

FIU

at No. 21 Stanford

North Carolina Central

Memphis

at Wake Forest

Virginia

at Virginia Tech

North Carolina

at. No. 10 Florida State

No. 9 Clemson

at Georgia Tech

Miami (FL)

vs. Cincinnati (Belk Bowl)

References

Duke
Duke Blue Devils football seasons
Duke Blue Devils football